Allison Davis may refer to:

Allison Davis (anthropologist) (1902–1983), American anthropologist
Allison Davis (television executive) (born 1953), American television executive
Allison S. Davis, American lawyer